The Roman Catholic Diocese of Barra is a diocese located in the city of Barra in the Ecclesiastical province of Feira de Santana in Brazil.

History
 October 20, 1913: Established as Diocese of Barra from the Metropolitan Archdiocese of São Salvador da Bahia

Leadership
 Bishops of Barra (Latin Rite)
 Augusto Álvaro da Silva (1915.06.25 – 1924.12.17), appointed Archbishop of São Salvador da Bahia
 Antônio Bezerra de Menezes (1925), did not take effect
 Adalberto Accioli Sobral (1927.04.22 – 1934.01.13), appointed Bishop of Pesqueira, Pernambuco
 Rodolfo das Mercés de Oliveira Pena (1935.06.08 – 1942.01.03), appointed Bishop of Valença, Rio de Janeiro
 João Batista Muniz, C.Ss.R. (1942.08.24 – 1966.12.09)
Tiago Gerardo Cloin, C.Ss.R. (1966.12.09 – 1975.10.24)
 Orlando Octacílio Dotti, O.F.M. Cap. (1976.04.01 – 1983.05.30), appointed Coadjutor Bishop of Vacaria, Rio Grande do Sul
 Itamar Navildo Vian, O.F.M. Cap. (1983.12.29 – 1995.02.22), appointed Bishop of Feira de Santana, Bahia
 Luís Flávio Cappio, O.F.M. (1997.04.16 – present)

References
 GCatholic.org
 Catholic Hierarchy

Roman Catholic dioceses in Brazil
Christian organizations established in 1913
Barra, Roman Catholic Diocese of
Roman Catholic dioceses and prelatures established in the 20th century
1913 establishments in Brazil